Carson Kressley (born November 11, 1969) is an American television personality, actor, and designer. Beginning in 2003, he appeared in the Bravo series Queer Eye for the Straight Guy. He was also the motivational host of the TV show How to Look Good Naked and OWN's Carson Nation and a contestant on season 13 of Dancing with the Stars. 

Since 2015, Kressley has been a judge on RuPaul's Drag Race. Beginning in October 2018, he teamed up with former Queer Eye colleague Thom Filicia for a new series called Get a Room with Carson & Thom on Bravo. The series followed the two as Thom mentored Carson in the interior design business, and featured two clients in each episode. The show lasted one ten-episode season on Bravo, with the final episode broadcast on December 22, 2018.

Early life
Kressley was born in Allentown, Pennsylvania, and raised in nearby Orefield, Pennsylvania. His family raised ponies. He competed in equestrian events from an early age was a member of the U.S. World Cup Saddle Seat equitation team in 1999. He won a world championship in 2009.

He graduated from Northwestern Lehigh High School in New Tripoli, Pennsylvania in 1987. Kressley earned a bachelor's degree from Gettysburg College in 1991, where he was elected to Phi Beta Kappa and was a member of Alpha Phi Omega, a service fraternity.

Television
Kressley began his career as an independent stylist, then worked for Ralph Lauren from 1994 until 2002, working in menswear and corporate advertising. In 2003, Kressley gained exposure as the fashion savant on Queer Eye when the show debuted on the Bravo cable television network. Kressley appears on Good Morning America, the E! Network, and others. Furthermore, he has critiqued red carpet fashions at the Oscars and the Golden Globes. In 2005, he acted as a judge for the Miss Universe pageant, which aired from Bangkok, Thailand. In 2006, he returned to the Miss Universe pageant as commentator and was a commentator for the 2006 Miss USA pageant.

In February 2007, he was the host of a new Lifetime makeover show, How to Look Good Naked (a U.S. version of a British series). The show's premiere episode on January 4, 2008 drew a record 1.6 million viewers, included significant viewership among adults 18-49 and adults 18-34 as well as the network's target demographic of women aged 18-34. In January 2008, the debut episode of How to Look Good Naked was Lifetime's highest-rated premiere in those three demographics.

Kressley appeared as Master of Ceremonies on Cyndi Lauper's True Colors Tour 2008. He was a host on the ABC series True Beauty, along with Vanessa Minnillo and Beth Stern. In 2011, Kressley began a show on the Oprah Winfrey Network titled Carson Nation.

In 2018, Kressley joined with his former Queer Eye teammate Thom Filicia for Get a Room with Carson & Thom on Bravo. The program lasted one season, covering ten episodes that were broadcast from October through December 2018.

Contestant 
 In November 2006, Kressley competed on a celebrity edition of Jeopardy against Regis Philbin and Nancy Grace. Carson took second place, losing by one dollar.
 In September 2011, Kressley was a participant on the 13th season of Dancing with the Stars, partnered with professional dancer Anna Trebunskaya. Kressley proved to be a fan favorite but was voted off week five of the competition.
 In August 2016, Kressley appeared on Celebrity Family Feud with members of his family.
 In January 2017, Kressley appeared as a contestant on The New Celebrity Apprentice.
 In February 2017, Kressley became a celebrity contestant on the Australian version of I'm a Celebrity...Get Me Out of Here!.
 In August 2017, Carson Kressley started as a contestant on season 11 of Worst Cooks in America.
 In December 2017, Kressley appeared as a contestant on The Chase.
 In February 2022, Kressley appeared as a HouseGuest on the third season of Celebrity Big Brother.

Judge 
 In May 2005, he was one of the judge for Miss Universe 2005 in Bangkok, Thailand.
 In May 2007, he acted as a judge on reality series Crowned: The Mother of All Pageants where mother and daughter teams compete in a beauty pageant. 
 In 2015, Kressley and Ross Mathews were named as new regular judges for the seventh season of RuPaul's Drag Race. In 2016 he also became a regular judge on the spin-off RuPaul's Drag Race All Stars from its second season onwards and in 2020 judged RuPaul's Secret Celebrity Drag Race.
 In December 2019, he appeared as a judge on the Freeform gift wrap competition, Wrap Battle.
 In June 2021, he appeared as a judge on the Food Network BBQ competition series, BBQ Brawl.
In July 2022, he appeared as a guest judge on Food Network’s Beat Bobby Flay.

Commentator 
 In July 2006, Kressley was the commentator alongside with former Miss USA, Shandi Finnessey.
 In May 2016, Kressley was announced as a commentator with Michelle Collins for the Eurovision Song Contest 2016 on Logo TV; the first time the United States has broadcast the competition live.
 In November 2017, Kressley appeared as a commentator alongside Lu Sierra for Miss Universe 2017. 
 The pair also commentated in May 2018, the Miss USA 2018. 
 Kressley and Sierra were slated to return at the Miss Universe 2018.
 In December 2021, Kressley along with reigning Miss Universe Andrea Meza hosted the Miss Universe 2021 preliminary competition. He also served as commentator for the finals along with Miss USA 2019, Cheslie Kryst.

Acting
In 2005, Kressley made his film debut in The Perfect Man starring Heather Locklear and Hilary Duff, playing Lance, a bartender. He starred in The Year Without a Santa Claus with John Goodman as Santa, which aired December 11, 2006, on NBC. He had a cameo role in his third movie, the independent comedy 16 to Life. The feature film It's Christmas, Carol! premiered December 2012. In 2021, he had a supporting role in holiday film The Bitch Who Stole Christmas, which aired on VH1.

Fashion design
In November 2006, Kressley debuted  Perfect, his clothing for men and women, on QVC. He cites his experience as a stylist with Ralph Lauren and on Queer Eye as inspiration for the line, saying he "...realized a lot of people are missing great basics in their wardrobe. I consider my perfect collection for QVC to be 'basics with a twist.'" He debuted a new women's collection for Shop NBC in April 2012. The collection, called "Love, Carson", is built on transformative pieces that provide women with affordable glamour.

Books
 Author of the 2004 book Off The Cuff: The essential style guide for men and the women who love them.
 Author of You're Different and That's Super, a 2005 children's story deriving inspiration from the classic tale "The Ugly Duckling," featuring a unicorn who grows up among a herd of horses from foalhood to maturity.
 Co-author, Queer Eye for the Straight Guy: The Fab Five's Guide to Looking Better, Cooking Better, Dressing Better, Behaving Better, and Living Better (Clarkson Potter, 2004), with the four other cast members.
 Author (with Riann Smith) of the 2016 book Does This Book Make My Butt Look Big?: A Cheeky Guide to Feeling Sexier in Your Own Skin and Unleashing Your Personal Style.

Other activities
In April 2006, Kressley became ordained over the Internet as a minister of the Universal Life Church, in order to be able to perform a wedding ceremony during an episode of Queer Eye.

Kressley is also an owner of American Saddlebred horses and is horse show exhibitor. He won a world title in 2009. Kressley's interest in horses combined with his interest in promoting respect for diversity resulted in his authorship of 'You're Different and That's Super!', illustrated by cartoonist Jared Lee.

Kressley was an ambassador for the Melbourne Cup in 2007, playing a part in the "Fashion On The Field".

Honors, awards, distinctions
In 2004 Queer Eye won an Emmy Award for "Outstanding Reality Program". It was nominated again for that category in 2005.
After interviewing him on WMAL-FM's "Mornings on the Mall", co-host Mary Walter was "shocked to find out that Carson is crazy smart — I'm talking Mensa smart!"

Filmography

Television

See also
 LGBT culture in New York City
 List of LGBT people from New York City

References

External links

Carson Kressley interview with Portland Magazine

1969 births
Living people
21st-century LGBT people
American fashion designers
American male television actors
American male film actors
American gay actors
American male writers
Emmy Award winners
Fashion stylists
Gettysburg College alumni
I'm a Celebrity...Get Me Out of Here! (Australian TV series) participants
American LGBT broadcasters
LGBT people from Pennsylvania
Male actors from Pennsylvania
Northwestern Lehigh School District alumni
Participants in American reality television series
People from Lehigh County, Pennsylvania
The Apprentice (franchise) contestants
Judges in American reality television series